The UK Indie Chart is a weekly chart that ranks the biggest-selling singles that are released on independent record labels in the United Kingdom. The chart is compiled by the Official Charts Company, and is based on both physical and digital single sales. During 2006, 36 singles reached number one.

The biggest-selling indie hit of the year was "JCB" by Nizlopi, which sold over 146,000 copies during 2006, despite having been released the previous year. Other high-selling indie hits included "Love Don't Let Me Go (Walking Away)" by David Guetta vs. The Egg, which sold 132,000 singles and reached the top three of the UK Singles Chart, and "When the Sun Goes Down" by Arctic Monkeys, which sold over 123,000 copies and reached number one on the UK Singles Chart.

Eight acts managed to top the UK Indie Chart with two different singles. They were: Embrace, Franz Ferdinand, The Raconteurs, Arctic Monkeys, Bob Sinclar, ¡Forward, Russia! and The Long Blondes. Morrissey was the only act to reach number one with three different singles, namely "You Have Killed Me", "In The Future When All's Well" and "I Just Want to See the Boy Happy".

Chart history

See also
List of UK Dance Singles Chart number ones of 2006
List of UK Dance Albums Chart number ones of 2006
List of UK Singles Downloads Chart number ones of the 2000s
List of UK Rock & Metal Singles Chart number ones of 2006
List of UK Singles Chart number ones of the 2000s

References
General

Specific

External links
Independent Singles Chart at the Official Charts Company
UK Top 30 Indie Singles Chart at BBC Radio 1

UK Indie Chart number-one singles
United Kingdom Indie Singles
Indie 2006